Kipunada (Brahmi script:  Ki-pu-ṇa-dha), also Kipanadha, was probably the last ruler of the Kushan Empire around 335-350 CE. He is known for his gold coinage. He succeeded Shaka I. Kipunada was probably only a local ruler in the area of Taxila, in western Punjab, and he may have been a subject of Gupta Emperor Samudragupta.

Gupta and Kidarite successors 
The coins of Kipunada in Central and Western Punjab were followed by peculiar coins minted locally in Punjab, with the name "Samudra" on them (Gupta script:), presumably connected to the Gupta Empire ruler Samudragupta. Soon after this, coinage was issued in Punjab by Kidarite Hun rulers known as Kirada, Peroz and then the famous Kidara, who occupied the territory formerly held by the Kushans.

Notes

External links 
 Coins of late Kushan emperors

Kushan emperors
4th-century Indian monarchs